Lithium Baptist Church is a Baptist church in Lithium, Missouri.

History
Lithium Baptist church was organized in 1885. Lithium Baptist church is a member of the Cape Girardeau Baptist Association.

References 

Baptist churches in Missouri
1885 establishments in Missouri
Churches in Perry County, Missouri
Lithium, Missouri